Thelema is an EP by the Murder City Devils released on September 4, 2001 on Sub Pop Records. It is their last release of entirely original material before they broke up later that year. Spencer Moody has said that it was "really my favorite stuff overall." To support the EP, the band went on a tour in October 2001, which continued as previously planned despite the sudden departure of the band's keyboardist, Leslie Hardy. It was reissued on vinyl on February 17, 2009.

Reception

AllMusic's Tom Semioli wrote that "Despite the album's short running time, the Murder City Devils cover a lot of ground on this outing." Some of the Murder City Devils' fans were unhappy with the EP, because it included more catchy hooks and complex song structures than their previous work. In 2003, Pitchfork Media's Amanda Petrusich wrote that the EP contains "some decent melodies and a lot more attention to instrumentation– and structure– than their previous albums."

Track listing
That's What You Get – 2:49
Bear Away – 3:27
Midnight Service at the Mütter Museum – 3:39
One Vision of May – 2:28
Bride of the Elephant Man – 3:58 
364 Days – 4:38

References

2001 EPs
Sub Pop EPs
Punk rock EPs
Murder City Devils albums